Ambra di Talamello is an Italian cheese that originated in the Marche region of Italy and is produced in Talamello, Italy. 

It is a type of Formaggio di Fossa, a designation for cheeses that are aged underground. Ambra di Talamello is wrapped in cloth and then aged in pits constructed of tufa limestone, and the floors of the pits are lined with cheesecloth and hay. During the aging process, the cheese develops a mold and ferments, which gives it a sharp flavor. 

The cheese is aged for a few months, after which it obtains a golden, amber coloration.

Etymology
The word  means "amber" in Italian. Ambra di Talamello is a registered trademark, and is designated as "the official commercial name of fossa cheese".

See also

 List of Italian cheeses

References

External links
 The Amber of Talamello. Fossa Cheese Fair. Emiliaromagnaturismo.it

Cuisine of Emilia-Romagna
Italian cheeses